Transition is the second album by R&B singer-songwriter and producer Ryan Leslie. This is the second album by Leslie released in 2009, nine months after his self-titled debut album.  The entire album is written, arranged, produced and engineered by Ryan Leslie. It was inspired by a lady whom Leslie met during a rehearsal for his showcase at New York's S.O.B.'s. They went on to have a relationship during the summer of 2009, which the album tells the story of. The first single for the album is entitled "You're Not My Girl", which was released in July 2009. The second single "I Choose You" was released in January 2010. The album was nominated for Best Contemporary R&B album at the 53rd Annual Grammy Awards. 
The Album has sold 60,000 copies in US.

Track listing

References

2009 albums
Albums produced by Ryan Leslie
Ryan Leslie albums